Akogun Olugbenga Akinola Omole, (born 30 April 1972 in Oka Akoko, Ondo State) is a Nigerian politician, legislator, football administrator and farmer. He is the chairman of Akogun Farms Nigeria Limited and currently represents Akoko South West Constituency I in the Ondo State House of Assembly.

Early life and education 
Olugbenga Omole started his elementary education at Saint John's & Mary Demonstration Primary School, Owo, between 1977 and 1983 and Owo High School, Owo, for his secondary education between 1983 and 1988. He proceeded to the Federal School of Arts and Science, Ondo for his higher school certificate from 1989 to 1991. He obtained his bachelor's degree in geography from the University of Ilorin in 1997. Olugbenga also attended Adekunle Ajasin University in Akungba Akoko, where he earned a master's degree in public administration.

Business and personal life  
A football administrator and political tactician, Omole has been a member of Campaign for Democracy since 1995 and a member Committee for the Defense of Human Rights since 1995. He is a foundation member of Ondo State Youth in Politics and the Action Congress of Nigeria that later metamorphosed into the All Progressive Congress.

Prior to his emergence as the Candidate of his Party, all Progressives Congress for House Assembly Akoko South West Constituency 1 Oka, Akogun was appointed Education Secretary for Akoko South West in October 2017 by Ondo State Governor, Arakunrin Oluwarotimi Akeredolu SAN. Under his purview, over 50 different projects in 17 public primary schools were executed and 90% of these projects were completed before he resigned to contest in the House of Assembly primary.  He eventually won the general election with a landslide victory in March 2019.<ref name=

He collaborated with an Indian and a United Nation Awardee Urmila Chanam, a global expert in menstrual hygiene and founder of Breaking the Silence, by organizing workshops in various secondary schools in Ondo State focusing on girls and the Chief Executive Officer of Hero Communication and Events Management company as well as Akogun Farms Nigeria Limited.

Political career 
At the early stage of his political career, Omole was appointed personal assistant to the Former Governor of Ondo State Chief Adebayo Adefarati in Charge of Youth and Union Matters from 2001 to 2003. He was later handed a higher responsibility at the Ondo State Football Agency as a camp commandant and welfare officer of Sunshine Stars Football Club between September 2009 and December 2011, a time the Ondo State team got a continental ticket for the first time.

Omole served as the chairman of the Youth Directorate of Buhari/Osinbajo Campaign Organization in Ondo State in 2015 and later as the coordinator of Arakunrin Rotimi Akeredolu 2016 Governorship election campaign organization in Akoko South West Local Government. He was also a founding member of Action Congress of Nigeria that later metamorphosed into the All Progressives Congress. He was elected as a member of Ondo State House of Assembly under the All Progressive Congress in 2019.

Awards 

 Winner of 2019 Ondo State Legislator of The Year and Emerging Leader of The Year
 Award of Excellence by Akure Topaz Lions Club
 Trace Magazine's Grassroots Developments Award 2018
 Commander of Christian Faith African Church, Oka Akoko Diocese
 Outstanding Man of the Year 2020 by Chronicle Magazine, Award of Excellence by NUT Akoko South West Local Government Chapter
 Ondo State Leadership Award as Legislator of the Year 2019 by Hero Magazine

References

Living people
People from Ondo State
Legislative speakers in Nigeria
1974 births
All Progressives Congress politicians